Medicago littoralis is a plant species of the genus Medicago. It is found primarily in the Mediterranean basin. It forms a symbiotic relationship with the bacterium Sinorhizobium meliloti, which is capable of nitrogen fixation. Common names include shore medick, water medick, coastal medick, and strand medick.

Gallery

References

External links 
 International Legume Database & Information Services

littoralis
Flora of Malta